Wernekinck is a surname. Notable people with the surname include:

Franz Wernekinck (1764–1839), German physician and botanist
Friedrich Christian Gregor Wernekinck (1789–1835), German anatomist, son of Franz

German-language surnames